Charco Azul Formation is a geologic formation of the Charco Azul Group in western Panama and southeastern Costa Rica. It preserves gastropod fossils dating back to the Pliocene period.

Description 
The Charco Azul Formation comprises tuffaceous shales deposited in a deep marine environment The formation unconformably underlies the Armuelles Formation. The formation is correlated to the Jama and Canoa Formations of Ecuador.

Fossil content 
These fossils have been reported from the formation:
 Strombina (Recurvina) penita, Strombina (Recurvina) recurva
 Distorsio decussata
 Marsupina bufo, M. nana

See also 

 List of fossiliferous stratigraphic units in Costa Rica
 List of fossiliferous stratigraphic units in Panama

References

Further reading 
 P. Jung. 1989. Revision of the Strombina-group (Gastropoda; Columbellidae), fossil and living. Schweierische Paläontologische Abhandlungen 111:1-298

Geologic formations of Costa Rica
Neogene Costa Rica
Geologic formations of Panama
Neogene Panama
Shale formations
Tuff formations
Deep marine deposits
Formations